The 2019–20 Serbian First League was the 15th season of the Serbian First League since its establishment.

2019–20 league format
In 2019–20 season 16 teams competed in regular season. At the end of regular season top 8 teams were supposed to play promotion playoff round, while 8 lowest placed teams were supposed to play in the relegation playoff round. At the end of relegation playoff four bottom placed teams will be relegated to the Serbian League. At the end of promotion playoff round two top placed teams will earn promotion into Serbian SuperLiga, while third and fourth placed teams will play additional two round promotion playoff games against thirteen and fourteen placed teams from 2019–20 Serbian SuperLiga.

Team changes
The following teams have changed division since the 2018–19 season.

To First League
Promoted from Serbian League
 Grafičar
 Radnički Pirot
 Kabel
 Smederevo 1924
 Kolubara

Relegated from 2018–19 Serbian SuperLiga
 Dinamo
 Zemun
 Bačka

From First League
Relegated to Serbian League
 Bečej 1918
 Teleoptik
 Sloboda
 Bežanija
 Borac

Promoted to 2019–20 Serbian SuperLiga
 TSC
 Javor
 Inđija

Teams

Transfers
For the list of transfers involving First League clubs during 2019–20 season, please see: List of Serbian football transfers summer 2019, List of Serbian football transfers winter 2019–20.

Regular season

League table

Results

Individual statistics

Top goalscorers
As of matches played on 20 June 2020.

Hat-tricks

Notes

References

External links
 Official website
 srbijasport.net

Serbian First League seasons
2019–20 in Serbian football leagues
Serbia